Ravilja Salimova, also known as Ravilja Prokopenko (8 September 1941 - 1 July 2019) was an Uzbek basketball player who played in the Soviet Union women's national basketball teams which won the European women's basketball championship in 1962, 1964, 1966, and 1968 and the 1964 FIBA World Championship for Women.

She was born in Surxondaryo Region of the USSR on 8 September 1941, and died in Tashkent, Uzbekistan, on 1 July 2019.

References

1941 births
2019 deaths
People from Surxondaryo Region
Soviet women's basketball players
Uzbekistani women's basketball players
Honoured Masters of Sport of the USSR